Hassan Youssef (born  27 January 1993)  is an Egyptian footballer with Aswan SC on loan from Tala'ea El-Gaish SC.

Career
Youssef is a graduate of the Zamalek youth academy and got his first team debut in the 2010–2011 season.

References

External links
 

1993 births
Living people
Egyptian footballers
Zamalek SC players
Tala'ea El Gaish SC players
Aswan SC players
Egyptian Premier League players
Association football midfielders